A mucosal fold refers to a fold in any mucous membrane in the body.

This may refer to:
 Gastric fold of the gastric mucosa
 Transverse folds of rectum in the anal canal
 Circular folds in the small intestine